In the Iliad, Iphianassa (Ancient Greek: Ίφιάνασσα Īphianassa "strong queen")  is an obscure and controversial daughter of Agamemnon and Clytaemnestra, sister to Laodice and Chrysothemis, sometimes considered identical to Iphigeneia.

Mythology 
Extant plays by Sophocles, Aeschylus and Euripides on the tale of Orestes and Electra do not include her as a character. This is consistent with the theory that she and Iphigeneia are one and the same.  On the other hand, Sophocles does mention her, and hints that she lives in the palace of Aegisthus and Clytemnestra, together with Electra and Chrysothemis.

Lucretius, in De Rerum Natura, mentions Iphianassa being sacrificed by her father on the altar of the "Virgin of the Crossways" (Triviai virginis) Diana at Aulis as an offering to ensure a successful voyage, in undoubted reference to the tradition of Iphigeneia. Lucretius cited this episode to make the point: "Superstition (religio) was able to induce so great an evil."

Notes

References 

 Homer, The Iliad with an English Translation by A.T. Murray, Ph.D. in two volumes. Cambridge, MA., Harvard University Press; London, William Heinemann, Ltd. 1924. . Online version at the Perseus Digital Library.
 Homer, Homeri Opera in five volumes. Oxford, Oxford University Press. 1920. . Greek text available at the Perseus Digital Library.
 Sophocles, The Electra of Sophocles edited with introduction and notes by Sir Richard Jebb. Cambridge. Cambridge University Press. 1893. Online version at the Perseus Digital Library.
 Sophocles, Sophocles. Vol 2: Ajax. Electra. Trachiniae. Philoctetes with an English translation by F. Storr. The Loeb classical library, 21. Francis Storr. London; New York. William Heinemann Ltd.; The Macmillan Company. 1913. Greek text available at the Perseus Digital Library.

Further reading 

 Bartelink, Dr. G.J.M. (1988). Prisma van de mythologie. Utrecht: Het Spectrum.

Princesses in Greek mythology
Children of Agamemnon